The Journal of Wildlife Diseases is a peer-reviewed quarterly journal published by the Wildlife Disease Association. The journal publishes research papers, case and epizootic reports, review articles, and book reviews on wildlife disease investigations. According to the Journal Citation Reports, the journal has a 2014 impact factor of 1.355.

References

External links
 

Veterinary medicine journals
Biology journals
Publications established in 1965
Delayed open access journals